Jean-Jacques "J. J." Wilson Nshobozwabyosenumukiza (born 26 June 1998) is a Rwandan basketball player who currently plays for REG on loan from APR of the Rwanda Basketball League (RBL). He is also a member of the Rwanda national basketball team.

Early life
Born in the Nyarugenge District of Kigali, the capital of Rwanda. His role model was NBA player Kyrie Irving.

Club career
After an impressive performance at the 2016 FIBA Africa Under-18 Championship, Nshobozwabyosenumukiza was recruited by most top teams from the NBL Rwanda. He decided to join Espoir BBC, his dream team since his childhood, in 2016 and immediately became a starter for the team.

In 2018, Nshobozwabyosenumukiza became a member of REG BBC, a newly established team in Rwanda. He was sent on loan to play for Patriots BBC ahead of the inaugural season of the BAL. He came off the bench for the Patriots, averaging 3.3 points in 12.1 minutes per game.

Nshobozwabyosenumukiza returned to REG and joined the team for the 2022 BAL season. On 9 March 2022, he scored a buzzer-beating three pointer to give his team the 82–80 win over SLAC, while also adding 15 points. On 14 March, he scored a BAL career-high 28 points, including 8 three point field goals, in a win over Beira. On 27 May, he was named to the BAL All-Defensive Team.

On October 6, 2022, Wilson signed a 2-year contract with APR. He rejoined REG for the 2023 BAL season, signing a temporary agreement with the team.

National team career
Wilson was selected for the Rwanda U-16 national team in 2015, and later also played for the U-18 team.

Wilson represents the Rwandan national basketball team. On 22 March 2021, Wilson broke the world record for most steals when he had 14 steals in a qualification game against South Sudan.

3x3 basketball 
On December 4, 2022, he won a bronze medal at the FIBA 3x3 Africa Cup and was named to the Team of the Tournament.

BAL career statistics

|-
| style="text-align:left;"|2021
| style="text-align:left;"|Patriots
| 6 || 1 || 12.3 || .350 || .444 || .667 || 2.5 || 1.2 || 1.2 || .0 || 3.3
|-
| style="text-align:left;"|2022
| style="text-align:left;"|REG
| 6 || 0 || 24.7 || .412 || .436 || .750 || 5.2 || 3.8 || 1.5 || .2 || 13.7
|-

Personal
Wilson is a Christian. Nshobozwabyosenumukiza has received attention for his long surname, which he says means "I am able to do everything because of God".

Awards and accomplishments

Club
REG
2× Rwanda Basketball League: (2021, 2022)
2× Heroes Cup: (2019, 2020)

Individual
BAL All-Defensive Team: (2022)
2× RBL All-Star: (2021, 2022)

References

External links
RealGM profile

1998 births
Living people
People from Kigali
Rwandan men's basketball players
Point guards
Espoir BBC players
REG BBC players
Patriots BBC players
APR B.C. players